Maitree is an Indian television series that premiered on 7 February 2023 on Zee TV. Produced under Sunshine Productions, it stars Shrenu Parikh, Bhaweeka Chaudhary and Namish Taneja. It formerly starred Zaan Khan.

Synopsis 
Maitree and Nandini are best friends since childhood but when they grow up, Maitree feels betrayed by Nandini due to some unknown reasons and a rift gets created between the friendship of the duo.

Plot 
Maitree and Nandini are best friends and, to avoid being separated from each other, hope to marry into the same house.

15 years later

Nandini and Maitree are now grown up. Nandini is married to Ashish. They are also expecting their first child. Ashish is a lawyer by profession. Eventually Maitree marries Saaransh, Ashish's younger cousin. Unknown to anyone, Saaransh is a drug addict. Saaransh and Maitree; Nandini and Ashish get into a car accident. Ashish and Maitree luckily survive the accident. Nandini falls into a coma after delivering a baby boy while Saaransh succumbs to his injuries and dies. Saaransh's mother, Sona Tiwari blames Maitree for Saaransh's death. Nandini's mother, Vasundhara accidentally mentions in front of Ashish that Saaransh was a drug addict, which shocks him. Maitree decides to take care of Nandini and Ashish's son. Vasundhara informs Maitree that Saaransh was a drug addict. Maitree is devastated and confronts Ashish. Ashish tries to conceal the truth but fails as Vasundhara had sent Saaransh's reports to Maitree.

Ashish gets arrested and Vasundhara uses false evidences in court against him to prove that he is a drug dealer. But later, he gets bail and attends his son's naming ceremony. Ashish and Nandini's son is named Nandish-which is a combination of their names.

Cast

Main
 Shrenu Parikh as Maitree Tiwari (née Mishra) – Saaransh's widow; Nandini and Ashish's best-friend; Vishwas and Sona's daughter-in-law; Dinesh and Sadhana's daughter ; Sachin's sister; Nandish's aunt (2023–present)
  * Zara Khan as child Maitree 
 Bhaweeka Chaudhary as Nandini Tiwari (née Singh Rathore) – Ashish's wife; Maitree's best-friend; Nandish's mother ; Om and Kusum's daughter in law; Vasundhara's daughter; Rajkumar and Princey's cousin sister (2023–present)
 Urvi Upadhyay as child Nandini
 Namish Taneja as Ashish Tiwari – Saaransh's elder cousin; Nandini's husband; Nandish's father ; Om and Kusum's son (2023–present)
 Zaan Khan as Saaransh Tiwari –  Ashish's younger cousin; Maitree's husband; Sona and Vishwas's son ; Nandish's uncle ; Nandini's brother-in-law (2023) (Dead)

Recurring
 Ananya Khare as Sona Tiwari - Vishwas's wife; Saraansh's mother; Maitree's mother-in-law ; Ashish's aunt 
 Khalida jan as Vasundhara Singh Rathore - Nandini's mother; Ashish's mother-in-law; Nandish's grand-mother; a famous lawyer ; Rajkumar and  Princey's aunt ; Neelu's sister in law ; Chakramani's sister
 Vijaylaxmi Singh as Sadhana Mishra - Maitree's and Sachin mother; saransh's mother in law; Dinesh's wife 
 Pratish Vora as Om Prakash Tiwari - Ashish's Father ; Vishwas's brother; Kusum's Husband; Nandini 's father in law ; Nandish's Grandfather 
 Naman Arora as Rajkumar - Nandini's cousin brother; Princey's brother; Chakramani and Neelu's son
 Govind Khatri as Chakramani - Vasundhara's brother; Princey and Rajkumar's father ; Nandini's uncle; Neelu's husband 
 Smita Gupta as Kusum Tiwari - Om's wife; Ashish's mother; Nandini's mother-in-law; Nandish's grand-mother; Saraansh's aunt
 Azima Shaikh as baby Nandish Tiwari - Ashish and Nandini's son ; Vasundhara , Om, Kusum, Sona and Vishwas's grandson
 Chirag Kapoor as Sachin Mishra - Sadhana and Dinesh's son; Maitree's brother; 
Sangeeta Adhikary as Neelu Singh - Princey's and Rajkumar's mother; Vasundhara's sister-in-law; Nandini's aunt; Chakramani's wife 
Diksha Tiwari as Princey Singh - Neelu and Chakramani's daughter; Nandini's cousin sister; Rajkumar 's sister 
 Amit Kapoor as Dinesh Mishra - Maitree and Sachin's father; a Police Officer; Saransh's father in law; Sadhana's husband

Production
The series was announced on Zee TV by Sunshine Productions. Shrenu Parikh, Bhaweeka Chaudhary, Zaan Khan and Namish Taneja were signed as the lead. The launch event for the series was held on 4 February 2023.

See also
 List of programmes broadcast by Zee TV

References

External links
 
 Maitree at ZEE5

2023 Indian television series debuts
2020s Indian television series
Hindi-language television shows
Zee TV original programming